Masi Mordeh (also Romanized as Māsī Mordeh) is a village in Nurabad Rural District, in the Central District of Delfan County, Lorestan Province, Iran. At the 2006 census, its population was 25, in 5 families.

References 

Towns and villages in Delfan County